van der Westhuizen (also known as van der Westhuisen, van der Westhysen) is a common Afrikaans surname of Dutch/Flemish origin. The largest number of van der Westhuizens can be found in Africa, but because of immigration large numbers of van der Westhuizens can also be found in Argentina, Australia, United Kingdom, Canada, New Zealand and the United States. Van der Westhuizens have had a notable presence in South African history, most notably the Great Trek, First Boer War and the Second Boer War, as well as strategic campaigns in both World Wars.

Family history 
The origins of the family name began with Pieter Jansz van der Westhuizen, a native of Bruges , Flanders . The first record of Pieter Jansz's arrival in Cape Town is in 1662 as a soldier for the Dutch East India Company, where he changed his name to van der Westhuizen from Westhuysen. Later Pieter Jansz worked as a servant for Tieleman Hendricks till the late 1660s. Pieter became a Free Citizen ('Vryburger' in Afrikaans) in 1670 along with Hendrik Coester, and in 1673 he married Maria Hendrickz Winkelhuisen, the German widow of Hendrik Barentsz, adopting her three children. Together they had seven children (Maria, Johannes, Claas, Barent, Hendrik, Helena, and Pieter). In 1706 Pieter married Eva Gerritsz Ligthart (widow of Jan Douwensz Mos) from Amsterdam, after the death of Maria earlier that year.

On 23 March 1677, the Cape Council of Policy granted land to Pieter Jansz van der Westhuisen and Willem Schalkszoon van der Merwe in the region of Hout Bay to develop agriculture in the region. Van der Westhuizen founded the largest farm in Hout Bay known as Kronendal, which became a very prosperous piece of farmland in the Cape and even received visits from Simon van der Stel.

The farmlands of Kronendal are the oldest farmlands still in use in South Africa. Maria van der Westhuizen was the daughter of Pieter Jansz van der Westhuizen, and was raised on the family farm of Kronendal. Maria received much fame for her wealth, real-estate and was the founding ancestor of both the Van Niekerk and the Walters families.  Maria left her fortune to her seven sons, which consisted of 83000 guilders, 35 slaves, 1400 sheep, 25000 vines and 10 farming estates (Mosselbank, Brakkefontein, Sandvliet, Slot van Paarl, Meerendal, De Grendel, Hoorenbos (8900 guilders), De Tijgerberge (21600 guilders), Drooge Vallei (15000 guilders) en Zeekoeivallei (1209 guilders)). Because of the inheritance left from Maria to her seven sons who each received about 12000 guilders, they were able to have a significant influence on the economy of the Cape after Maria's death in 1734.

Family tributes 

The well known van der Westhuizen street in the Cape is named after the van der Westhuizen family (Other significant street names also exist in the Northern Cape, Western Cape, Gauteng ('Transvaal'), Chatham in the United Kingdom and in Alberta Canada).

 Van Der Westhuizen Street, Carletonville, Gauteng.
 Van Der Westhuizen Street, Heidelberg, Gauteng.
 Van Der Westhuizen Street, Oudtshoorn, Western Cape.

Notable family members 
Joost van der Westhuizen (1971-2017), South African rugby union footballer
Bernice van der Westhuizen, South African singer/songwriter. Runner up of maak my famous
Johann van der Westhuizen, judge in the Constitutional Court of South Africa
Jacob van der Westhuizen, director of the Institute for Criminology of UNISA
Louis van der Westhuizen, a Namibian cricketer
Charlize van der Westhuizen, a South African cricketer
Marco van der Westhuizen , former rugby player and pastor
Yolandi van der Westhuizen, an international cricketer
Hermanus Petrus van der Westhuizen, a South African leather designer
Minki van der Westhuizen, well-known model
Peter van der Westhuizen, former South African runner
Burt Maree van der Westhuizen, South African Springbok in fullbore shooting
Joffel van der Westhuizen, former Lieutenant General of the South African army.
Diehan van der Westhuizen, South African Musician

Alternate spellings

Van der Westhuyzen
 Dane van der Westhuyzen, rugby player
 Jaco van der Westhuyzen, rugby player
 Jean van der Westhuyzen, South African-Australian sprint canoeist

Van der Westhuysen
Hannah van der Westhuysen, English actress.

Afrikaans-language surnames
Dutch-language surnames
Surnames of Dutch origin